Traktorostroy is a rural locality (a settlement) in Ilyichyovskoye Rural Settlement, Leninsky District, Volgograd Oblast, Russia. The population was 258 as of 2010. There are 6 streets.

Geography 
Traktorostroy is located on the Caspian Depression, 60 km northeast of Leninsk (the district's administrative centre) by road. Rassvet is the nearest rural locality.

References 

Rural localities in Leninsky District, Volgograd Oblast